Metachanda baryscias is a moth species in the oecophorine tribe Metachandini. It was described by Edward Meyrick in 1930. Its type locality is Curepipe, Mauritius.

References

Oecophorinae
Moths described in 1930
Taxa named by Edward Meyrick
Moths of Mauritius